Old Cumnock Parish was one of 10 electoral wards of Cumnock and Doon Valley District Council. Created in 1974, the ward elected one councillor using the first-past-the-post voting electoral system.

The ward produced strong results for Labour with the party holding the seat at two of the three elections. It was also one of the Scottish Labour Party's (SLP) few successes in the 1977 local elections.

In 1984, the ward was abolished and the area covered by it split between two newly created wards – Cumnock South and Old Cumnock and Cumnock West and Auchinleck.

Boundaries
The Old Cumnock Parish ward was created in 1974 by the Formation Electoral Arrangements from the previous Old Cumnock electoral division of Ayr County Council. The ward took in part of the town of Cumnock, south of Cumnock Burgh and took in an area in the centre of Cumnock and Doon Valley. Following the Initial Statutory Reviews of Electoral Arrangements in 1981 the ward was abolished and replaced by two new wards – Cumnock South and Old Cumnock and Cumnock West and Auchinleck.

Councillors

Election results

1980 election

1977 election

1974 election

References

Wards of East Ayrshire
Cumnock